Torlesse is a surname. Notable people with the surname include:

 Arthur David Torlesse (1902–1995), Royal Navy officer
 Charles Torlesse (1825–1866), New Zealand surveyor
 Elizabeth Torlesse (1835–1922), New Zealand homemaker and community leader